The Lenstra elliptic-curve factorization or the elliptic-curve factorization method (ECM) is a fast, sub-exponential running time, algorithm for integer factorization, which employs elliptic curves.  For general-purpose factoring, ECM is the third-fastest known factoring method.  The second-fastest is the multiple polynomial quadratic sieve, and the fastest is the general number field sieve. The Lenstra elliptic-curve factorization is named after Hendrik Lenstra.

Practically speaking, ECM is considered a special-purpose factoring algorithm, as it is most suitable for finding small factors. , it is still the best algorithm for divisors not exceeding 50 to 60 digits, as its running time is dominated by the size of the smallest factor p rather than by the size of the number n to be factored. Frequently, ECM is used to remove small factors from a very large integer with many factors; if the remaining integer is still composite, then it has only large factors and is factored using general-purpose techniques. The largest factor found using ECM so far has 83 decimal digits and was discovered on 7 September 2013 by R. Propper. Increasing the number of curves tested improves the chances of finding a factor, but they are not linear with the increase in the number of digits.

Algorithm
The Lenstra elliptic-curve factorization method to find a factor of a given natural number  works as follows:
This can be done by first picking random , and then setting  to assure the point is on the curve.
 One can define Addition of two points on the curve, to define a Group. The addition laws are given in the article on elliptic curves.
We can form repeated multiples of a point : .
 Compute  on the elliptic curve, where  is a product of many small numbers: say, a product of small primes raised to small powers, as in the p-1 algorithm, or the factorial  for some not too large . This can be done efficiently, one small factor at a time. Say, to get , first compute , then , then , and so on.  is picked to be small enough so that -wise point addition can be performed in reasonable time.
If we finish all the calculations above without encountering non-invertible elements, it means that the elliptic curves' (modulo primes) order is not smooth enough, so we need to try again with a different curve and starting point.

Why does the algorithm work?

If p and q are two prime divisors of n, then   implies the same equation also  and  These two smaller elliptic curves with the -addition are now genuine groups. If these groups have Np and Nq elements, respectively, then for any point P on the original curve, by Lagrange's theorem,  is minimal such that  on the curve modulo p implies that k divides Np; moreover, . The analogous statement holds for the curve modulo q. Hence it is unlikely that most of the prime factors of Np and Nq are the same, and it is quite likely that while computing eP, we will encounter some kP that is ∞  but not  or vice versa. When this is the case, kP does not exist on the original curve, and in the computations we found some v with either  or  but not both. That is,  gave a non-trivial factor 

ECM is at its core an improvement of the older  algorithm. The  algorithm finds prime factors p such that  is b-powersmooth for small values of b. Then  is likely to produce a factor of n. However, the algorithm fails when  has large prime factors, as is the case for numbers containing strong primes, for example.

ECM gets around this obstacle by considering the group of a random elliptic curve over the finite field Zp, rather than considering the multiplicative group of Zp which always has order 

Although there is no proof that a smooth group order will be found in the Hasse-interval, by using heuristic probabilistic methods, the Canfield–Erdős–Pomerance theorem with suitably optimized parameter choices, and the L-notation, we can expect to try  curves before getting a smooth group order. This heuristic estimate is very reliable in practice.

An example

We want to factor  Let's choose the elliptic curve  with the point  on it, and let's try to compute 

Using s we can compute 2A. If the value of s is of the form a/b where b > 1 and gcd(a,b) = 1, we have to find the modular inverse of b. If it does not exist, gcd(n,b) is a non-trivial factor of n.

First we compute 2P.

Then we compute 3(2P). We have  Using the Euclidean algorithm:  then  then  then  then  then  Hence  and working backwards (a version of the extended Euclidean algorithm):   Hence  and  Given this s, we can compute the coordinates of 2(2P), just as we did above:  Just to check that this is indeed a point on the curve:  After this, we can compute .

We can similarly compute 4!P, and so on, but 8!P requires inverting  The Euclidean algorithm gives that 455839 is divisible by 599, and we have found a 

The reason that this worked is that the curve  has  points, while  it has  points. Moreover, 640 and 777 are the smallest positive integers k such that  on the curve  and  respectively. Since  is a multiple of 640 but not a multiple of 777, we have  on the curve  but not on the curve  hence the repeated addition broke down here, yielding the factorization.

The algorithm with projective coordinates

Before considering the projective plane over  first consider a 'normal' projective space over ℝ: Instead of points, lines through the origin are studied. A line may be represented as a non-zero point , under an equivalence relation ~ given by:  ⇔ ∃ c ≠ 0 such that x' = cx, y' = cy and z' = cz. Note that the point  does not exist in this space since to draw a line in any possible direction requires at least one of x',y' or z' ≠ 0. Now observe that almost all lines go through any given reference plane - such as the (X,Y,1)-plane, whilst the lines precisely parallel to this plane, having coordinates (X,Y,0), specify directions uniquely, as 'points at infinity' that are used in the affine (X,Y)-plane it lies above.

In the algorithm, only the group structure of an elliptic curve over the field ℝ is used. Since we do not necessarily need the field ℝ, a finite field will also provide a group structure on an elliptic curve. The Elliptic Curve Method makes use of the failure cases of the addition law.

We now state the algorithm in projective coordinates. The neutral element is then given by the point at infinity . Let  be a (positive) integer and consider the elliptic curve (a set of points with some structure on it) .

 Pick  with  ≠ 0.
 Calculate . It has the point .
 Choose an upperbound  for this elliptic curve.
 Calculate .
 Calculate  (k times) in the ring . In this case, a non-trivial divisor can be found.
 If not, then go back to step 2. If this does occur, then you will notice this when simplifying the product 

In point 5 it is said that under the right circumstances a non-trivial divisor can be found. As pointed out in Lenstra's article (Factoring Integers with Elliptic Curves) the addition needs the assumption . If  are not  and distinct (otherwise addition works similarly, but is a little different), then addition works as follows:

 To calculate:  ,
 ,
 ,
 ,
 .

If addition fails, this will be due to a failure calculating  In particular, because  can not always be calculated if  is not prime (and therefore  is not a field). Without making use of  being a field, one could calculate:

 ,
 ,
 ,
 , and simplify if possible.

Twisted Edwards curves

The use of Edwards curves needs fewer modular multiplications and less time than the use of Montgomery curves or Weierstrass curves (other used methods). Using Edwards curves you can also find more primes.

Definition.

There are five known ways to build a set of points on an Edwards curve: the set of affine points, the set of projective points, the set of inverted points, the set of extended points and the set of completed points.

The set of affine points is given by:

.

The addition law is given by

The other representations are defined similar to how the projective Weierstrass curve follows from the affine.

Any elliptic curve in Edwards form has a point of order 4.

The following curves have a torsion group isomorphic to :

  with point  where  and 
  with point  where  and 

Every Edwards curve with a point of order 3 can be written in the ways shown above.

Stage 2

The above text is about the first stage of elliptic curve factorisation.

GMP-ECM and EECM-MPFQ

The use of Twisted Edwards elliptic curves, as well as other techniques were used by Bernstein et al to provide an optimized implementation of ECM. Its only drawback is that it works on smaller composite numbers than the more general purpose implementation, GMP-ECM of Zimmerman.

Hyperelliptic-curve method (HECM)

There are recent developments in using hyperelliptic curves to factor integers. By making use of the Kummer surface, calculation is more efficient. The disadvantages of the hyperelliptic curve (versus an elliptic curve) are compensated by this alternative way of calculating. Therefore, Cosset roughly claims that using hyperelliptic curves for factorization is no worse than using elliptic curves.

Quantum version (GEECM)
Bernstein, Heninger, Lou, & Valenta suggest GEECM, a quantum version of ECM with Edwards curves. It uses Grover's algorithm to roughly double the length of the primes found compared to standard EECM, assuming a quantum computer with sufficiently many qubits and of comparable speed to the classical computer running EECM.

See also
UBASIC for practical program (ECMX).

References

External links
 Factorization using the Elliptic Curve Method, a WebAssembly application which uses ECM and switches to the Self-Initializing Quadratic Sieve when it is faster.
 GMP-ECM, an efficient implementation of ECM.
 ECMNet, an easy client-server implementation that works with several factorization projects.
 pyecm, a python implementation of ECM.  Much faster with psyco and/or gmpy.
 Distributed computing project yoyo@Home Subproject ECM is a program for Elliptic Curve Factorization which is used by a couple of projects to find factors for different kind of numbers.
 Lenstra Elliptic Curve Factorization algorithm source code Simple C and GMP Elliptic Curve Factorization Algorithm source code.
 EECM-MPFQ An implementation of ECM using Edwards curves written with the MPFQ finite field library.

Integer factorization algorithms
Finite fields